The 2021 Toledo Rockets football team represented the University of Toledo during the 2021 NCAA Division I FBS football season. The Rockets were led by sixth-year head coach Jason Candle and played their home games at the Glass Bowl in Toledo, Ohio. They competed as members of the West Division of the Mid-American Conference (MAC).

Schedule

References

Toledo
Toledo Rockets football seasons
Toledo Football